Empire Amethyst was an 8,032-ton tanker which was built in 1941.

History
Empire Amethyst was built by the Furness Shipbuilding Co Ltd, Haverton Hill-on-Tees as yard number 330. She was launched on 8 July 1941 and completed in December 1941. Empire Amethyst was built for the Ministry of War Transport and operated under the management of the Hadley Shipping Co Ltd, Middlesbrough. Empire Amethyst was homeported in Middlesbrough.

Empire Amethyst was a member of a number of convoys during the Second World War.

ON 17
Convoy ON 17 sailed from Liverpool on 17 September 1941 and Loch Ewe on 19 September. The convoy dispersed on 29 September.

On 23 January 1942, Empire Amethyst picked up five survivors from the Norwegian SS Innerøy, which had been torpedoed and sunk by U-553. The survivors were taken to Halifax, Nova Scotia.

HX 173

Convoy HX 173 sailed from Halifax for Liverpool on 1 February 1942, arriving on 14 February.

OS 21

Convoy OS 21 sailed from Liverpool on 4 March 1942 and arrived at Freetown, Sierra Leone on 24 March. Empire Amethyst was in ballast, having discharged her cargo at Milford Haven. She had to call at Belfast to allow a crew member to be discharged through illness and a replacement to be taken on board. On reaching Freetown, Empire Amethyst sailed for New Orleans.

Final voyage and sinking
In mid-April 1942, Empire Amethyst left New Orleans bound for Freetown carrying a cargo of 12,000 tons of motor spirit. Her intended route took her via the Lesser Antilles and then across the Atlantic to Freetown.

At 03:02 hrs Empire Amethyst received a distress call from the American SS Delvalla which had been torpedoed  by U-154 and was sinking. Prince Henry headed for the reported position of the Delvalla and a Catalina aircraft was despatched. The survivors were taken aboard Prince Henry.

U-154 spotted Empire Amethyst again at 11:42 hrs; she was again under escort by Prince Henry but at 16:00 hrs the escort had been lost. As he was short of torpedoes, Kapitän Kölle decided to attack from the surface. The chase began at 20:00 hrs with Empire Amethyst zig-zagging but generally following a heading of 110° towards Trinidad. Empire Amethyst managed to lose her pursuer at 00:24 on 13 April by making a sharp turn. At 01:27 hrs, Kölle ordered his engines stopped to try to ascertain where Empire Amethyst was. Kölle decided to head in the direction that Empire Amethyst was generally heading and by 04:30 had found her again. At 05:52, Kölle aimed the first of two torpedoes at Empire Amethyst, which hit under the bridge.

The crew of Empire Amethyst are commemorated on the Tower Hill Memorial.

Official number and code letters
Official Numbers were a forerunner to IMO Numbers.

Empire Amethyst had the UK official number 164848 and used the Code Letters BCPL.

References

1941 ships
Empire ships
Maritime incidents in April 1942
Ministry of War Transport ships
Ships sunk by German submarines in World War II
Steamships of the United Kingdom
Tankers of the United Kingdom
Ships built on the River Tees
World War II shipwrecks in the Caribbean Sea
World War II tankers
Ships lost with all hands